Andy Chen (Hsuan-Yu Chen) (born July 12, 1986) is a Taiwanese figure skater. He is the 2005 Taiwan national champion. Chen is a three time competitor on the Junior Grand Prix circuit and a one time competitor at the World Junior Figure Skating Championships. Chen is coached by Anthony Liu and Igor Pashkevich. He currently attends California State University, San Bernardino.

External links
 

Taiwanese male single skaters
Living people
1986 births
Sportspeople from Tainan